Solomon Paul, known as Dareysteel, he is also known as Golongolo Master, (sometimes stylized as DareySteel), is a Spanish rapper, singer-songwriter, recording artist,  performer, and Record producer .

Early life 
He was born in Jesse, Delta State of Nigeria and lived in Anambra State before moving to Seville Spain later becoming a Spanish national. He started out with music at age 12, but has made a living being a musician and a producer in Spain since 1998.

Music career and success 

Dareysteel released his debut single on promotional Mixtapes selections in Madrid in 2003, but has gotten most attention for his single "Boom Boom", released in January 2014 in the US and several European countries, and appearing in several charts. Dareysteel came into limelight following the release of his singles "Boom Boom", "Shake ya Booty", "Celebration", "Golongolo", and "Fly Higher", which received significant airplay. The "Celebration" song video was featured on Top40-Charts. Dareysteel has been described by Vanguard as "one of the world's most relevant singers". Upon releasing the single "Celebration" from the album Unstoppable, he announced that he will donate 50% of the income from his album sales to various charity organizations "in support of the homeless people and motherless babies".

In the first week of April 2015, Dareysteel released a new single, "Pump it Up", along with "Get Down on the Floor", "Hold On", "How Come", and "Murder", in which he talks against violence, war, and crime in Africa and the rest of the world. Dareysteel album singles were featured on Charts in France Pure Charts the first week of the album release.

In 2016, Dareysteel released the albums Unbreakable (March 2016) and Man of the Year (May 2016); both albums and songs were featured on Charts in France Pure Charts. Dareysteel equally sees music as a powerful tool that can be used to fight injustice and bring about positive change to society.

In the second week of July 2018, Dareysteel released the album, Untouchable.
On January 1, 2020, he released the singles "Invisible", "Mariana", and "I Love Your Body". On January 2, 2021, he released the album Uplifted.

Discography

Studio albums 
 Dangerous (2012)
 Unstoppable (2015)
 Unbreakable (2016)
 Man of the Year (2016)
 Untouchable (2018)
 Uplifted (2021)

Singles

See also 
 List of Spanish musicians
 Spanish hip hop 
 List of bands from Spain 
 Music of Spain
 List of hip hop musicians

References

External links 
Dareysteel on AllMusic

Living people
1975 births 
Spanish male rappers
Hip hop singers
Spanish songwriters 
Nigerian emigrants to Spain
People from Delta State
Nigerian songwriters 
English-language singers from Spain 
Spanish male singers 
Nigerian male rappers
People_from_Seville